Rayford Tilman Petty is an American college football coach and former player. He served as head football coach at Howard University from 2002 to 2006, and again in an interim capacity in 2013, compiling an overall record of 31–36. His career also includes positions as an assistant coach at North Carolina A&T University, Southern University, Norfolk State University and Delaware State University. A graduate of Elon University, Petty played as a linebacker for the Phoenix during the late 1970s.

Head coaching record

Notes

References

External links
 Howard profile

Year of birth missing (living people)
Living people
American football linebackers
Chowan Hawks football players
Delaware State Hornets football coaches
Elon Phoenix football players
High school football coaches in Maryland
Howard Bison football coaches
Norfolk State Spartans football coaches
North Carolina A&T Aggies football coaches
Southern Jaguars football coaches
African-American coaches of American football
African-American players of American football
20th-century African-American sportspeople
21st-century African-American sportspeople